Yekaterina Anatolievna "Katya" Smolina (born 8 October 1988) is a Russian ice hockey forward,  playing with SKIF Nizhny Novgorod of the Zhenskaya Hockey League (ZhHL). She was a member of the Russian national ice hockey team during 2005 to 2019 and participated in three Winter Olympic Games and eight IIHF Women's World Championships.

International career
Smolina was selected for the Russia women's national ice hockey team in the 2006 and 2014 Winter Olympics. In 2006, she didn't have a point in five games, and in 2014, she played in all six games, recording one assist.

As of 2014, Smolina has also appeared for Russia at five IIHF Women's World Championships. Her appearance came in 2007. She won a bronze medal as a part of the team in 2013 and 2016.

Career statistics

International career
Through 2013–14 season

References

External links
 
 
 

1988 births
Living people
Sportspeople from Oskemen
Russian women's ice hockey forwards
HC SKIF players
HC Tornado players
Olympic ice hockey players of Russia
Ice hockey players at the 2006 Winter Olympics
Ice hockey players at the 2014 Winter Olympics
Ice hockey players at the 2018 Winter Olympics
Russian expatriate ice hockey people
Russian expatriate sportspeople in Sweden
Djurgårdens IF Hockey Dam players